Commando is the autobiography of guitarist and songwriter Johnny Ramone of the punk rock band The Ramones. The book was released in 2012 by Linda Ramone, surviving spouse of Johnny Ramone, following the death of Johnny in 2004 from prostate cancer.

Content

Commando is an autobiography on the life of Johnny Ramone. He began writing the book in 1999 when he was diagnosed with prostate cancer. In an interview with Billboard Magazine, Linda Ramone stated:

The book is 176 pages and contains pictures that were chosen by Linda Ramone. It contains musings from Johnny's childhood and personal stories of his life and time with The Ramones. Events he includes in the book are his admission to getting a New York City police officer to release mace into an audience at a Ramones concert. Additional events include him beating up Malcolm McLaren as well as his bandmates Joey and Dee Dee. The book also covers his relationship with his wife Linda Ramone and the events surrounding her initially dating Joey Ramone before she left Joey for Johnny.

The epilogue was written by Lisa Marie Presley, a close friend of Johnny and Linda Ramone. The foreword of the book was written by the only surviving original member of The Ramones at that time, Tommy Ramone. Tommy was quoted as saying:

Reception

The book was released in April 2012. Prior to and following the release, Linda Ramone promoted the book by giving numerous interviews in both print and televised national media, including Fox News, Billboard Magazine, and MTV. The book was reviewed by numerous well known publications including the Houston Chronicle, the National Post, PopMatters, and MTV which called the book a must-have for any Ramones fan.

References

External links
 Publisher website

Ramones
Abrams Books books
2012 non-fiction books